N35 may refer to:

 N35 (Long Island bus)
 Acer N35, a PDA
 Beechcraft N35 Bonanza, an American civil utility aircraft
 French submarine N35, a German submarine surrendered to France after the Second World War
 , a submarine of the Royal Navy
 Karakoram Highway, in Pakistan
 London Buses route N35
 Nebraska Highway 35, in the United States
 Punxsutawney Municipal Airport, in Pennsylvania, United States